No comment is a phrase used as a response to journalistic inquiries which the respondent does not wish to answer. Public figures may decline to comment on issues they are questioned or have nothing to say about the issue at the time. 

No comment indicates that the speaker does not choose to say anything on the subject, and it is automatically invalidated if the speaker then comments or answers questions.  It is not a request for the material to be considered off the record or otherwise kept confidential. If the speaker wishes to talk about the subject, but does not wish to be named as a source, he must obtain the journalist's explicit agreement in advance that the response is not to be used for attribution.

In many English-speaking countries such as the U.K. and the U.S., this phrase is also a stock phrase, especially in popular culture, where a suspect or person being interviewed in a criminal investigation wishes to exercise their right to silence.

Etymology 

The first recorded usage as a stock answer to questions was made in 1950 by Charles Ross, President Harry Truman's White House press secretary. According to William Safire, Winston Churchill attributed the phrase to American diplomat Sumner Welles.

Criticism 
Some public relations professionals have argued against the use of no comment, stating that one of the goals of working with the press is to resolve issues before they become hot topics. Offering no comment allows the press to fill in the blanks, diverts the focus of the publicity, and sacrifices an opportunity to communicate key messages.

See also
 Glomar response

References 

Journalism terminology
Public relations terminology
English-language idioms